Georgia's 10th congressional district is a congressional district in the U.S. state of Georgia. The district is currently represented by Republican Mike Collins, and includes a large swath of urban and rural territory between Atlanta and Augusta.

The district's boundaries were redrawn following the 2010 census, which granted an additional congressional seat to Georgia.  The first election using the new district boundaries (listed below) were the 2012 congressional elections.

Located in the eastern part of the state, the district boundaries include the cities of Athens, Eatonton, Jackson, Milledgeville, Monroe, Washington, Watkinsville, Winder, and Wrightsville.

Counties
 Baldwin
 Barrow
 Butts
Clarke (Partial, see also )
 Columbia (Partial, see also )
 Glascock
 Greene
 Gwinnett (Partial, see also  and )
 Hancock
 Henry (Partial, see also  and )
 Jasper
 Jefferson
 Johnson
 Lincoln
 McDuffie
 Morgan
 Newton (Partial, see also )
 Oconee
 Oglethorpe
 Putnam
 Taliaferro
 Walton
 Warren
 Washington
 Wilkes

Recent results in presidential elections

List of members representing the district

Election results

2006

2008

2010

2012

2014

2016

2018

2020

2022

See also
Georgia's congressional districts
List of United States congressional districts

References

 Congressional Biographical Directory of the United States 1774–present

External links
 PDF map of Georgia's 10th district at nationalatlas.gov
 Georgia's 10th district at GovTrack.us

10
1885 establishments in Georgia (U.S. state)